Khandwa Assembly constituency is one of the 230 constituencies in the Madhya Pradesh Legislative Assembly of Madhya Pradesh a central state of India. It is also part of Khandwa Lok Sabha constituency and is a reserved seat for the Scheduled castes (SC).

The main battle is expected to be between the two time incumbent MLA Shri. Devendra Verma of BJP and Shri. Kundan Malviya of the Indian National Congress. The BJP has been winning since 1990.

Members of Legislative Assembly
 1952: Bhagwantrao Mandloi, Indian National Congress
 1957: Bhagwantrao Mandloi and Deokaran Balchand, both of Indian National Congress
 1962: Bhagwantrao Mandloi, Indian National Congress
 1967: Krishnarao, Bhartiya Jan Sangh
 1972: Gangacharan Mishra, Indian National Congress
 1977: Govind Prasad Gite, Janata Party
 1980: Gangacharan Mishra, Indian National Congress (I)
 1985: Smt Nanda Mandloi, Indian National Congress
 1990: Hukum Chand Yadav, Bharatiya Janata Party
 1993: Puranmal Sharma, Bharatiya Janata Party
 1998: Hukum Chand Yadav, Bharatiya Janata Party
 2003: Hukum Chand Yadav, Bharatiya Janata Party
 2008: Devendra Verma, Bharatiya Janata Party
 2013: Devendra Verma, Bharatiya Janata Party

Election results

2018

2013

See also
 Khandwa
 List of constituencies of Madhya Pradesh Legislative Assembly
 Khandwa

References

Assembly constituencies of Madhya Pradesh
Khandwa
Khandwa district